Jean Francisco Rodrigues (born 28 November 1977), commonly known as Jean Paulista, is a former Brazilian footballer who played as a forward or an attacking midfielder.

Club career
Born in Sertãozinho, São Paulo, Paulista played with modest Sport Club Corinthians Alagoano and Esporte Clube Taubaté in his country. In 1998, he moved to Portugal where he remained for the following seven years, representing S.C. Farense, S.C. Braga and Vitória F.C. in the Primeira Liga and C.D. Aves, Imortal D.C. and F.C. Maia in the second division. His best personal output, in the country and overall, came in the 2003–04 season, when he scored seven goals to help Aves to the eighth position.

From 2005 to 2008, Paulista competed in Poland's Ekstraklasa with Wisła Kraków, netting five times in 27 appearances in his second year. In July 2008 he signed a two-year contract with APOEL FC in the Cypriot First Division, making his official debut for his new club in the first qualifying round of the UEFA Cup; also in that competition, against Red Star Belgrade, he suffered a serious injury which sidelined him for almost a year.

Paulista returned to full fitness in 2009–10, scoring twice to help APOEL to the second position. He added three appearances in that campaign's UEFA Champions League.

After one year still in the country, with AEK Larnaca FC, 33-year-old Paulista moved to Poland where he played mostly in the lower leagues, starting with Polonia Bytom.

External links

1977 births
Living people
Footballers from São Paulo (state)
Brazilian footballers
Association football midfielders
Association football forwards
Sport Club Corinthians Alagoano players
Esporte Clube Taubaté players
Primeira Liga players
Liga Portugal 2 players
Segunda Divisão players
S.C. Farense players
S.C. Braga players
S.C. Braga B players
C.D. Aves players
Imortal D.C. players
Vitória F.C. players
F.C. Maia players
Ekstraklasa players
I liga players
Wisła Kraków players
Polonia Bytom players
LZS Piotrówka players
Skra Częstochowa players
Cypriot First Division players
APOEL FC players
AEK Larnaca FC players
Brazilian expatriate footballers
Expatriate footballers in Portugal
Expatriate footballers in Poland
Expatriate footballers in Cyprus
Brazilian expatriate sportspeople in Portugal
Brazilian expatriate sportspeople in Poland
Brazilian expatriate sportspeople in Cyprus
People from Sertãozinho